Epp is a surname. Notable people with the surname include:

 Claas Epp Jr. (1838–1913), Russian Mennonite minister
 Dave Epp (born ), Canadian politician
 Elisabeth Epp (1910–2000), German actress
 Ernie Epp (born 1941), Canadian historian and former politician
 Franz Ritter von Epp (1868–1946), German officer 
 Herb Epp (1934–2013), Canadian politician 
 Jake Epp (born 1939), Canadian executive and former politician
 Josef Epp (1920–1989), Austrian footballer
 Ken Epp (born 1939), Canadian politician
 Leon Epp (1905-1968) Austrian music director, theatre director and actor.
 Phil Epp (born 1946), American artist
 Reuben Epp (1920-2009), Canadian author of works in Mennonite Low German 
 Richard Epp (actor) (born 1948), Canadian playwright and actor 
 Richard Epp (physicist), Canadian physicist
 Robert Epp (born 1926), translator of Japanese literature into English
 Susanna S. Epp (born 1943), American mathematician
 Theodore Epp (1907–1985), American Christian clergyman, writer and radio evangelist

See also
Epps (disambiguation)

Russian Mennonite surnames